I as in Icarus is a 1979 French thriller film directed by Henri Verneuil.

Selected cast
Yves Montand as Henri Volney
Michel Etcheverry as Frédéric Heiniger
Roger Planchon as Prof. David Naggara
Pierre Vernier as Charly Feruda
Jacques Denis as Despaul
Georges Staquet as Le gardien de l'immeuble d'assassinat
Brigitte Lahaie as Ursula Hoffman

Plot
The film's plot is based on the Kennedy assassination and subsequent investigation. The film begins with the assassination of President Marc Jarry, who is about to be inaugurated for a second six-year term of office. Henri Volney, state attorney and member of the commission charged with investigating the assassination (based on the Warren Commission) refuses to agree to the commission's final findings. The film portrays the initial controversy about this, as well as Volney and his staff's reopening of the investigation.

Fictional state
The action takes place in a fictional Western state where the spoken language is mainly French, but German, English and Spanish also are spoken. Its location, or even continent, is unknown. The capital city is made only of modern buildings, like Brasília. The political regime is presidential, the President being Marc Jarry at the beginning of the film.

Location
The new town of Cergy in the northwestern suburbs of Paris was used as a filming location for the movie. 
The EDF-GDF tower designed by architect Renzo Moro is the building from which the shots were fired to assassinate president Marc Jarry.
The governor's palace was the prefecture of the Val d'Oise. 
The huge room used for council meetings is the High Court of Justice. 
The long scene of the psychological experiment towards the end of the film, supposed to take place at the University of Laye, in fact  takes place at ESSEC Business School in Cergy.
This fictional Laye University is Yale University and the experiment shown in the film is the famous Milgram experiment, Stanley Milgram being a professor at Yale University.
The filmmakers chose the modern and innovative architecture of the new town to avoid depicting any particular country.

Accolades
The film was awarded the Grand prix du cinéma français for Best French Movie in 1979. It received five César Award nominations in 1980, including Best Movie, Best Actor (Yves Montand), Best Screenplay, Best Music and Best Production Design.

References

External links 
 
 

1979 films
1970s French-language films
1970s political thriller films
Films directed by Henri Verneuil
French political thriller films
Films scored by Ennio Morricone
Films set in Europe
Films à clef
1970s French films